Below are the rosters of the minor league affiliates of the Cincinnati Reds, and short biographies on some of the top prospects in the organization:

Players

Andrew Abbott

Andrew Cole Abbott (born June 1, 1999) is an American professional baseball pitcher in the Cincinnati Reds organization.

Abbott attended Halifax Count High School in South Boston, Virginia. He was drafted by the New York Yankees in the 36th round of the 2017 Major League Baseball Draft, but did not sign and played college baseball at the University of Virginia. In 2018, he played collegiate summer baseball with the Orleans Firebirds of the Cape Cod Baseball League. After four years at Virginia, he was drafted by the Cincinnati Reds in the second round of the 2021 MLB draft and signed.

Abbott spent his first professional season with the Arizona Complex League Reds and Daytona Tortugas. He started 2022 with the Dayton Dragons and was promoted to the Chattanooga Lookouts during the season. In 91 innings at Double-A (across 20 starts), he posted a 4.75 ERA with 119 strikeouts and 41 walks.He was one of five Reds prospects invited to the team's 2023 spring training camp.

Edwin Arroyo

Edwin Zaed Arroyo (born August 25, 2003) is a Puerto Rican professional baseball shortstop in the Cincinnati Reds organization.

Arroyo attended Arecibo Baseball Academy in Arecibo, Puerto Rico before coming to the United States to attend Central Pointe Christian Academy in Kissimmee, Florida for his senior season. He was drafted by the Seattle Mariners in the second round of the 2021 Major League Baseball draft.

Arroyo made his professional debut in 2021 with the Arizona Complex League Mariners. He started 2022 with the Modesto Nuts.

On July 29, 2022, the Mariners traded Arroyo, Noelvi Marte, Andrew Moore and Levi Stoudt to the Reds for pitcher Luis Castillo.

Bryce Bonnin

Bryce Reid Bonnin (born October 11, 1998) is an American professional baseball pitcher in the Cincinnati Reds organization.

Bonnin attended Barbers Hill High School in Mont Belvieu, Texas where he played baseball. Although he was considered a top prospect for the 2017 Major League Baseball draft, he was not selected until the 26th round by the Chicago Cubs. He did not sign and enrolled at the University of Arkansas to play college baseball. In 2018, his freshman year at Arkansas, he pitched 19 innings and went 1–0 with a 4.26 ERA. After the season, he played in the Cape Cod Baseball League for the Cotuit Kettleers. He then transferred to Texas Tech University to become a starting pitcher. For the 2019 season, he started 13 games and went 7–1 with a 4.08 ERA and 65 strikeouts over 64 innings. He made four starts in 2020 before the season was cancelled due to the COVID-19 pandemic. He was then selected by the Cincinnati Reds in the third round with the 84th overall pick of the 2020 Major League Baseball draft. He signed for $700,000.

Bonnin made his professional debut in 2021 with the Daytona Tortugas, was promoted to the Dayton Dragons during the season, and also made one rehab start for the Arizona Complex League Reds. He missed time during the season due to injury. Over 11 starts for the season, Bonnin went 4–2 with a 2.87 ERA and 71 strikeouts over 47 innings. He opened the 2022 season on the injured list. He was activated in late April and assigned back to Dayton. He was placed back on the injured list in early June and missed the remainder of the season. Over 25 innings pitched for the year, he went 1–1 with a 2.52 ERA, 28 strikeouts, and 12 walks.

Texas Tech Red Raiders bio

Joe Boyle

Joseph Patrick Boyle (born August 14, 1999) is an American professional baseball pitcher in the Cincinnati Reds organization.

Boyle attended North Oldham High School in Goshen, Kentucky where he played baseball. As a senior in 2017, he earned All-State honors. He opted out of the 2017 Major League Baseball draft, and enrolled at the University of Notre Dame to play college baseball.

As a freshman at Notre Dame in 2018, Boyle pitched two innings in which he gave up four earned runs and eight walks. That summer, he played in the Northwoods League for the Kalamazoo Growlers. He also briefly played in the Cape Cod Baseball League for the Cotuit Kettleers. In 2019, as a sophomore, Boyle made 18 relief appearances and went 3–3 with a 5.96 ERA, 39 strikeouts, and 27 walks over  innings. After the season, he returned to the Cape Cod Baseball League and played for the Harwich Mariners where he posted a 2.14 ERA and 39 strikeouts over 21 innings and was named a league all-star. Boyle pitched  innings for the 2020 season in which he posted a 3.24 ERA with 17 strikeouts and 13 walks before the remainder of the season was cancelled due to the COVID-19 pandemic. He was selected by the Cincinnati Reds in the fifth round of the 2020 Major League Baseball draft.

Boyle signed with the Reds and made his professional debut in 2021 with the Daytona Tortugas, posting a 3.55 ERA over  innings while missing time due to injury. He opened the 2022 season with the Dayton Dragons. He was named the Midwest League Pitcher of the Month for May. In early August, he was promoted to the Chattanooga Lookouts. Over 23 games (22 starts) between both teams, Boyle went 3–6 with a 2.86 ERA, 153 strikeouts, and 84 walks over  innings.

Notre Dame Fighting Irish bio

Michael Byrne

Michael Byrne (born April 16, 1997) is an American professional baseball pitcher in the Cincinnati Reds organization.

Byrne attended Olympia High School in Orlando, Florida. He played for the school's baseball team as a starting pitcher. Byrne enrolled at the University of Florida to play college baseball for the Florida Gators. He became their closer in 2017, his sophomore year. After the 2017 season, he played collegiate summer baseball with the Cotuit Kettleers of the Cape Cod Baseball League. In 2018, Byrne won the Stopper of the Year Award.

The Cincinnati Reds selected Byrne in the 14th round, with the 409th overall selection, of the 2018 MLB draft. Byrne signed with the Reds, and began his professional career with the Daytona Tortugas of the Class A-Advanced Florida State League. In  innings relief innings, he went 1–1 with a 1.25 ERA. He returned to Daytona in 2019, going 7–3 with a 4.27 ERA over 37 games (six starts). Byrne did not play in a game in 2020 due to the cancellation of the minor league season because of the COVID-19 pandemic. He was assigned to the Double-A Chattanooga Lookouts to begin the 2021 season.

Florida Gators bio

Tyler Callihan

Tyler Callihan (born June 22, 2000) is an American professional baseball second baseman in the Cincinnati Reds organization.

Callihan attended Providence School in Jacksonville, Florida where he began starting on their varsity baseball team as an eighth grader. In 2018, as a junior, he hit .440 with 11 home runs. As a senior in 2019, he batted .456 with 12 home runs alongside pitching to a 1.08 ERA over 26 innings. He was selected by the Cincinnati Reds in the third round with the 85th overall selection of the 2019 Major League Baseball draft. He signed for $1.5 million, forgoing his commitment to play college baseball at the University of South Carolina.

Callihan made his professional debut with the Greeneville Reds and was promoted to the Billings Mustangs at the season's end. Over 57 games between the two teams, he batted .263 with six home runs, 33 RBIs, and 11 stolen bases. He did not play a minor league game in 2020 due to the cancellation of the minor league season. He opened the 2021 season with the Daytona Tortugas. After 23 games in which he hit .299 with two home runs, he suffered a right elbow injury and missed the remainder of the season. After missing the beginning of the 2022 season while recovering from injury, he returned in mid-May with the Tortugas and hit a home run in his first at-bat. In late June, he was promoted to the Dayton Dragons. Over 88 games between the two teams, Callihan batted .250 with seven home runs, 33 RBIs, 19 doubles, and 15 stolen bases.

Allan Cerda

Allan Alexesis Cerda (born November 24, 1999) is an American professional baseball outfielder in the Cincinnati Reds organization.

Cerda signed with the Cincinnati Reds as an international free agent in July 2017. The Reds added him to their 40-man roster after the 2021 season. He was non-tendered on November 18, 2022 then re-signed a minor league deal a couple days later.

Elly De La Cruz

Elly Antonio De La Cruz (born January 11, 2002) is an Dominican professional baseball infielder in the Cincinnati Reds organization.

De La Cruz signed with the Cincinnati Reds as an international free agent in July 2018. He made his professional debut in 2019 with the Dominican Summer League Reds. He did not play in 2020 due to the minor league season being cancelled because of Covid-19. In 2021, De La Cruz played for the Arizona Complex League Reds and Daytona Tortugas.

De La Cruz was optioned to the Triple-A Louisville Bats to begin the 2023 season.

Christian Encarnacion-Strand

Christian Lee Encarnacion-Strand (born December 1, 1999) is an American baseball first baseman and third baseman in the Cincinnati Reds organization.

Encarnacion-Strand grew up in Pleasant Hill, California and attended College Park High School. As a senior, he was named the Diablo Athletic League Foothill Division MVP after batting .455 with 40 hits and 27 RBIs.

Encarnacion-Strand began his college baseball career at Yavapai College. As a freshman, he was named the Arizona Community College Athletic Conference Player of the Year after he batted .402 and led the conference with 22 home runs and 70 RBIs. Encarnacion-Strand was selected in the 34th round of the 2019 Major League Baseball draft by the Seattle Mariners, but did not sign with the team. He was hitting .430 with 11 home runs and 33 RBIs in 25 games as a sophomore before the season was cut short due to the coronavirus pandemic. Encarnacion-Strand transferred to Oklahoma State University for his remaining collegiate eligibility. In his only season with the Cowboys, he batted .361 with 15 home runs and 66 RBIs and was named the Big 12 Conference Newcomer of the Year.

Encarnacion-Strand was selected in the fourth round of the 2021 Major League Baseball draft by the Minnesota Twins. He was assigned to the Fort Myers Mighty Mussels of Low-A Southeast after signing with the team. Encarnacion-Strand began the 2022 season with the Cedar Rapids Kernels of the High-A Midwest League. He slashed 296/.370/.599 with 20 home runs and 68 RBIs in 74 games with Cedar Rapids before being promoted to the Double-A Wichita Wind Surge.

On August 2, 2022, the Twins traded Encarnacion-Strand, Spencer Steer, and Steve Hajjar, to the Cincinnati Reds in exchange for Tyler Mahle. The Reds assigned him to the Double-A Chattanooga Lookouts. In 2022 in the minor leagues he batted .304/.368/.587 in 484 at bats, and was tied for second-most in the minor leagues in RBIs with 114, behind Matt Mervis.

Yavapai Roughriders bio
Oklahoma State Cowboys bio

Steve Hajjar

Steven George Hajjar (born August 7, 2000) is an American professional baseball pitcher in the Cincinnati Reds organization.

Hajjar attended Central Catholic High School in Lawrence, Massachusetts. He was drafted by the Milwaukee Brewers in the 21st round of the 2018 Major League Baseball draft, but did not sign and played college baseball at the University of Michigan. After three seasons at Michigan, Hajjar was drafted by the Minnesota Twins in the second round of the 2021 Major League Baseball draft.

Hajjar made his professional debut in 2022 with the Fort Myers Mighty Mussels.

On August 2, 2022, the Twins traded Hajjar, Spencer Steer, and Christian Encarnacion-Strand, to the Cincinnati Reds in exchange for Tyler Mahle.

Rece Hinds

Rece Xola Hinds (born September 5, 2000) is an American professional baseball outfielder in the Cincinnati Reds organization.

Hinds was born and grew up in Niceville, Florida and initially attended Niceville High School. He was invited to play in the Under Armour All-America Game after both his sophomore and junior seasons. As a junior, Hinds hit .494 with 12 home runs and was also invited to the Perfect Game All-American Classic. Following his junior season, he transferred to IMG Academy in Bradenton, Florida. Hinds batted .361 with 33 runs, 17 RBIs, 14 stolen bases in his only season at IMG.

Hinds was selected in the 2nd round of the 2019 Major League Baseball draft by the Cincinnati Reds. After signing with the team he was assigned to the Greeneville Reds of the Class A-Short Season Appalachian League, where went 0–8 with two walks in 10 plate appearances. Hinds did not play in a game in 2020 due to the cancellation of the minor league season because of the COVID-19 pandemic, but was added to the Reds' alternate training site roster shortly after the beginning of the 2020 Major League Baseball season. Hinds was named the best overall athlete in the Reds' minor league system going into the 2021 season.  He spent the 2021 season with the Daytona Tortugas of the Low-A Southeast, slashing .251/.319/.515 with ten home runs, 27 RBIs, and six stolen bases over 43 games. He missed time during the season due to a torn meniscus.

On March 5, 2022, the Reds announced that Hinds would be switching his position from third base to the outfield. Reds farm director Shawn Pender added "We made a decision to get him (Hinds) on the field healthier."

He played in the 2022 Arizona Fall League, where he batted .234/.280/.403, and led the league in strikeouts (33; in 77 at bats).

Ricky Karcher

Ricky Karcher (born September 18, 1997) is an American professional baseball pitcher in the Cincinnati Reds organization.

Karcher grew up in Ponte Vedra, Florida and initially attended Ponte Vedra High School. Prior to his senior year of high school his family relocated to Saline, Michigan and he transferred to Saline High School.

Karcher began his college baseball career at Michigan. After his freshman season, he transferred to Walters State Community College. Karcher went 7–3 with a 4.27 ERA in 15 appearances with 12 starts in his lone season at Walters State.

Karcher was selected in the 13th round of the 2017 MLB draft by the Cincinnati Reds. He spent his first three seasons with the team primarily as a starting pitcher and was assigned to the Arizona League Reds, Greeneville Reds, and Billings Mustangs. He began the 2021 season with the Daytona Tortugas of Low-A Southeast and was moved to the bullpen. He made nine appearances and struck out 19 batters with Daytona before being promoted to the High-A Dayton Dragons. Karcher was assigned to the Double-A Chattanooga Lookouts at the start of the 2022 season. He was promoted to the Triple-A Louisville Bats after posting a 3.24 ERA with 42 strikeouts in 25 innings pitched.

Karcher was optioned to the Triple-A Louisville Bats to begin the 2023 season.

Michigan Wolverines bio

Casey Legumina

Casey Davey Legumina (born June 19, 1997) is an American professional baseball pitcher in the Cincinnati Reds organization.

Legumina attended Basha High School in Gilbert, Arizona. He was drafted by the Toronto Blue Jays in the 25th round of the 2016 Major League Baseball draft, but did not sign and played college baseball at Gonzaga University. He was then drafted by the Cleveland Indians in the 35th round of the 2018 MLB draft, but again did not sign and returned to Gonzaga. He was drafted a third time by the Minnesota Twins in the eighth round of the 2019 MLB draft and signed. The Twins added Legumina to their 40-man roster after the 2022 season.

On November 18, 2022, the Twins traded Legumina to the Cincinnati Reds for Kyle Farmer.
Legumina was optioned to the Triple-A Louisville Bats to begin the 2023 season.

James Marinan

James Marinan (born October 10, 1998) is an American professional baseball pitcher in the Cincinnati Reds organization.

Marinan attended Park Vista Community High School in Lake Worth, Florida. He was drafted by the Los Angeles Dodgers in the fourth round of the 2017 Major League Baseball Draft. On July 4, 2018, the Dodgers traded Marinan and Aneurys Zabala to the Cincinnati Reds for Dylan Floro and Zach Neal.

The Reds added Marinan to their 40-man roster after the 2021 season. 

Marinan was designated for assignment on June 11, 2022. He cleared waivers and was sent outright to the High-A Dayton Dragons on June 16. He made 26 total appearances for Dayton in 2022, struggling to a 3-3 record and 7.88 ERA with 55 strikeouts in 53.2 innings pitched.

Noelvi Marte

Noelvi Marte (born October 16, 2001) is a Dominican professional baseball shortstop in the Cincinnati Reds organization.

Marte signed with the Seattle Mariners as an international free agent in July 2018. He made his professional debut with the Dominican Summer League Mariners in 2019. In 65 games, he hit .309/.371/.511 with nine home runs and 54 runs batted in (RBIs).

Marte did not play a minor league game in 2020 due to the cancellation of the minor league season caused by the COVID-19 pandemic. He split the 2021 season between the Modesto Nuts and the Everett AquaSox, slashing .273/.366/.459 with 17 home runs, 71 RBIs, 28 doubles and 24 stolen bases.

On July 29, 2022, Marte, Edwin Arroyo, Andrew Moore, and Levi Stoudt were traded to the Cincinnati Reds for Luis Castillo.

Marte was optioned to the Double-A Chattanooga Lookouts to begin the 2023 season.

Alex McGarry

Alex McGarry (born May 11, 1998) is an American professional baseball first baseman and outfielder in the Cincinnati Reds organization.

McGarry grew up in Vancouver, Washington and attended Columbia River High School.

McGarry began his college baseball career at Tacoma Community College. He batted .336 with 10 doubles, two home runs, and 43 RBIs as a freshman. He transferred to Oregon State after his freshman year and redshirted his first season with the team. As a redshirt sophomore McGarry batted .293 with five doubles, eight home runs, and 29 RBIs and was named first team All-Pac-12 Conference. He was batting .288 before the 2020 season was cut short due to the coronavirus pandemic.

McGarry was signed by the Cincinnati Reds as an undrafted free agent on June 26, 2020. He was assigned to the Low-A Daytona Tortugas at the beginning of the season before being promoted to the High-A Dayton Dragons. McGarry started the 2022 season with Dayton, where he batted .286 with 11 home runs and 37 RBIs in 41 games before being promoted to the Double-A Chattanooga Lookouts.

Oregon State Beavers bio

Connor Phillips

Connor Allan Phillips (born May 4, 2001) is an American professional baseball pitcher in the Cincinnati Reds organization.

Phillips attended Magnolia West High School in Magnolia, Texas, where he played baseball and went 12–3 with a 1.13 ERA and 125 strikeouts over  innings as a senior in 2019. He was selected by the Toronto Blue Jays in the 35th round of the 2019 Major League Baseball draft but did not sign. He had originally signed to play college baseball for the LSU Tigers, but instead enrolled at McLennan Community College so he would be eligible for the draft after his freshman year. As a freshman at McLennan in 2020, he made six starts and went 3–1 with a 3.16 ERA over  innings before the season was cancelled due to the COVID-19 pandemic.

Phillips was selected by the Seattle Mariners with the 64th overall selection of the 2020 Major League Baseball draft. He signed for $1.1 million. He made his professional debut in 2021 with the Modesto Nuts and was promoted to the Everett AquaSox at the season's end. Over 17 starts between the two clubs, he went 7–4 with a 4.62 ERA, 111 strikeouts, and 46 walks over 76 innings.

On March 29, 2022, Phillips was acquired by the Cincinnati Reds as the player to be named later from an earlier trade that also sent Justin Dunn, Jake Fraley, and Brandon Williamson to the Reds in exchange for Jesse Winker and Eugenio Suárez. He was assigned to the Dayton Dragons to open the 2022 season. In late June, he was promoted to the Chattanooga Lookouts. Over 24 starts between the two teams, Philips went 5–8 with a 3.78 ERA and 150 strikeouts over  innings.

Nick Quintana

Nicholas Ryan Quintana (born October 13, 1997) is an American professional baseball infielder in the Cincinnati Reds organization.

Quintana attended the University of Arizona following a high school career at Arbor View High School in Las Vegas. He was named to the First Team All-Pac-12 for the first time as a sophomore after hitting .313 with fourteen home runs and 55 RBIs over the season. He would repeat the achievement as a junior in 2019 improving upon the prior year's numbers leaping to a .342 batting average, fifteen home runs, and 77 RBIs while improving his OBP from .413 to .462. He was named Collegiate Baseball Second Team All-American, as well a NCBWA Third Team All-American. In 2017 and 2018, he played collegiate summer baseball with the Yarmouth–Dennis Red Sox of the Cape Cod Baseball League.

Quintana was selected by the Detroit Tigers in the second round of the 2019 Major League Baseball draft with the 47th overall pick. This was his second time being selected in the draft, having previously been selected in the eleventh round of the 2016 Major League Baseball draft by the Boston Red Sox. After signing with the Tigers, he would immediately join the Single-A West Michigan Whitecaps. Despite starting in West Michigan, after a slow start hitting just .158 with a .228 OBP while striking out 51 times in 41 games, he would take a step down to the short season Single-A Connecticut Tigers in early-August. Over 25 games with Connecticut, he batted .256. He did not play a minor league game in 2020 due to the cancellation of the minor league season caused by the COVID-19 pandemic. In 2021, he played with the Single-A Lakeland Flying Tigers, slashing .196/.329/.346 with nine home runs and 46 RBIs over 82 games.

On November 3, 2021, the Tigers traded Quintana to the Reds for Tucker Barnhart.

Lyon Richardson

Lyon Richardson (born January 18, 2000) is an American professional baseball pitcher in the Cincinnati Reds organization.

Richardson attended Jensen Beach High School in Jensen Beach, Florida. He committed to play college baseball at the University of Florida. As a senior in 2018, he went 7–0 with a 0.58 ERA and ninety strikeouts over 48 innings alongside batting .369, and was named the Treasure Coast Newspapers Player of the Year. After his senior season, he was selected by the Cincinnati Reds in the second round (47th overall) of the 2018 Major League Baseball draft.

Richardson signed with the Reds and made his professional debut that year with the Greeneville Reds of the Rookie-level Appalachian League. Over 29 innings, he compiled a 0–5 record and a 7.14 ERA. In 2019, his first full minor league season, he played with the Dayton Dragons of the Class A Midwest League, going 3–9 with a 4.15 ERA and a 1.41 WHIP over 26 starts. After the cancellation of the 2020 minor league season due to the COVID-19 pandemic, he flew to Palm Beach Gardens, Florida and spent the summer working out at Cressey Sports Performance, participating in simulated games with fellow minor leaguers. In September, he was added to Cincinnati's 60-man player pool and participated in their instructional league. Richardson was assigned to Dayton, now members of the High-A Central, for the 2021 season; he appeared in 19 games (18 starts) in which he went 2–5 with a 5.09 ERA, 91 strikeouts, and 38 walks over 76 innings. Following the season's end, he underwent Tommy John surgery, and thus missed all of the 2022 season.

On November 15, 2022, the Reds selected Richardson's contract and added him to the 40-man roster. Richardson was optioned to the Double-A Chattanooga Lookouts to begin the 2023 season.

Christian Roa

Christian Michael Roa (born April 2, 1999) is an American professional baseball pitcher in the Cincinnati Reds organization.

Roa attended Memorial High School in Houston, Texas. He played both baseball and football. Undrafted in the 2017 Major League Baseball draft, he enrolled at Texas A&M University where he played college baseball for the Aggies.

In 2018, Roa's freshman season, he pitched in 14 games (with one start), pitching to a 4.30 ERA with 12 strikeouts over  innings. That summer, he played in the Northwoods League for the La Crosse Loggers. As a sophomore in 2019, he appeared in 17 games (making ten starts), going 3–2 with a 3.56 ERA and 46 strikeouts over 48 innings. On March 19, 2019, he was named the SEC Pitcher of the Week after throwing seven scoreless innings against the second ranked Vanderbilt Commodores. In 2020, Roa returned to the Aggies starting rotation. He started four games, pitching to a 2–1 record and a 5.85 ERA over twenty innings before the season was ended early due to the COVID-19 pandemic.

Roa was selected by the Cincinnati Reds in the second round with the 48th overall pick in the 2020 Major League Baseball draft. He signed with the Reds for $1.5 million. He did not play a minor league game in 2020 due to the cancellation of the minor league season caused by the pandemic. To begin the 2021 season, he was assigned to the Daytona Tortugas of the Low-A Southeast. He was placed on the injured list in May with a right elbow flexor mass strain, and did not return to play until mid-July. In early August, he was promoted to the Dayton Dragons of the High-A Central. Over 15 games (13 starts) between the two clubs, Roa went 4–3 with a 3.53 ERA and 67 strikeouts over  innings. He opened the 2022 season on the injured list, but was activated in early May and assigned to Dayton. In late August, he was promoted to the Chattanooga Lookouts of the Double-A Southern League. Over twenty starts between both teams, Roa went 6–3 with a 3.56 ERA and 102 strikeouts over ninety innings. He was selected to play in the Arizona Fall League for the Glendale Desert Dogs after the season.

Levi Stoudt

Levi Stoudt (born December 4, 1997) is an American professional baseball pitcher in the Cincinnati Reds organization.

Stoudt attended Perkiomen School in Pennsburg, Pennsylvania and played college baseball at Lehigh University. In 2018, he played collegiate summer baseball with the Orleans Firebirds of the Cape Cod Baseball League. He was drafted by the Seattle Mariners in the third round of the 2019 Major League Baseball draft.

Stoudt underwent Tommy John Surgery after the Mariners drafted him. He made his professional debut two years later in 2021 with the Everett AquaSox and was promoted to the Arkansas Travelers during the season. Over 15 starts between the two teams, he went 7–3 with a 3.31 ERA and 86 strikeouts over  innings.

On July 29, 2022, Stoudt, Edwin Arroyo, Andrew Moore, and Noelvi Marte were traded to the Cincinnati Reds for Luis Castillo.

On November 15, 2022, the Reds added Stoudt to their 40-man roster to protect him from the Rule 5 draft. He was optioned to the Triple-A Louisville Bats to begin the 2023 season.

Brandon Williamson

 Brandon Martin Williamson (born April 2, 1998) is an American professional baseball pitcher in the Cincinnati Reds organization.

Williamson attended Martin County West High School in Sherburn, Minnesota and played college baseball at North Iowa Area Community College and Texas Christian University (TCU). He was drafted by the Milwaukee Brewers in the 36th round of the 2018 Major League Baseball draft out of North Iowa but did not sign and transferred to TCU.

The Seattle Mariners selected Williamson in the second round of the 2019 Major League Baseball draft and he signed. Williamson made his professional debut with the Everett AquaSox, posting a 2.35 ERA over  innings. Due to the cancellation of the 2020 Minor League Baseball season caused by the COVID-19 pandemic, he did not pitch for a team, but was a member of the Mariners' 60-man player pool. Williamson returned to Everett to start 2021 and was promoted to the Arkansas Travelers during the season. Over 19 starts between the two teams, he went 4–6 with a 3.39 ERA and 153 strikeouts over  innings.

On March 14, 2022, the Mariners traded Williamson, Justin Dunn, Jake Fraley, and a player to be named later (Connor Phillips) to the Cincinnati Reds in exchange for Jesse Winker and Eugenio Suárez.

Full Triple-A to Rookie League rosters

Triple-A

Double-A

High-A

Single-A

Rookie

Foreign Rookie

References

Minor league players
Lists of minor league baseball players